Events from the year 1437 in France

Incumbents
 Monarch – Charles VII

Events
 12 November - Charles VII and his son the future Louis XI enter Paris in triumph following its recapture from the English during the Hundred Years War

References

1430s in France